Riculorampha is a genus of moths in the family Tortricidae.

Species
 Riculorampha ancyloides Rota & J.W. Brown, 2009

Tortricidae genera
Olethreutinae